Bill Dale Disney (April 3, 1932 – April 22, 2009) was an American speed skater who competed in the 1960 Winter Olympics and 1964 Winter Olympics.

He was born in Topeka, Kansas. Disney won the silver medal at the 1960 Winter Olympics in speed skating. Bill was also selected to be the flag bearer for 1964 Winter Olympics opening ceremony.

Personal records

Olympic results

References

Notes

Bibliography

 Eng, trond. All Time International Championships: Complete Results, 1889-2002. Askim, Norway: WSSSA-Skøytenytt, 2002.
 Eng, Trond and Marnix Koolhaas. National All Time & Encyclopedia, Men/Ladies, Issue No.4: "America" Volume 2; USA + Virgin Islands. Veggli, Norway: WSSSA-Skøytenytt, 1985.

External links
 skateresults
 sports-reference

1932 births
2009 deaths
American male speed skaters
Speed skaters at the 1960 Winter Olympics
Speed skaters at the 1964 Winter Olympics
Olympic silver medalists for the United States in speed skating
Sportspeople from Topeka, Kansas
Medalists at the 1960 Winter Olympics